The 2018 Tennis Championships of Honolulu was a professional tennis tournament played on outdoor hard courts. It was the first edition of the tournament and was part of the 2018 ITF Women's Circuit. It took place in Honolulu, United States, on 9–15 July 2018.

Singles main draw entrants

Seeds 

 1 Rankings as of 2 July 2018.

Other entrants 
The following players received a wildcard into the singles main draw:
  Ashley Lahey
  Lena Lutzeier
  Anastasia Nefedova
  Amanda Rodgers

The following players received entry from the qualifying draw:
  Andreea Ghițescu
  Catherine Harrison
  Dominique Schaefer
  Denise Starr

Champions

Singles

 Nao Hibino def.  Jessica Pegula, 6–0, 6–2

Doubles

 Misaki Doi /  Jessica Pegula def.  Taylor Johnson /  Ashley Lahey, 7–6(7–4), 6–3

External links 
 2018 Tennis Championships of Honolulu at ITFtennis.com
 Official website

2018 ITF Women's Circuit
2018 in American tennis
Tennis tournaments in Hawaii
2018 in sports in Hawaii
Tennis Championships of Honolulu